The Thiruvazhmarban Temple, also known as Sri Kuralappa Perumal Temple in Thiruppathisaram, a village in Kanyakumari district in the South Indian state of Tamil Nadu, is dedicated to the Hindu god Vishnu. Thiruvazhmarban Temple  is located about 5 km far, north-easterly to Nagercoil, 20 km far, north-westerly to Kanyakumari and 45 km south-west of Nanguneri Divya Desam. Constructed in the Dravidian style of architecture, the temple is glorified in the Nalayira Divya Prabandham, the early medieval Tamil canon of the Alvar saints from the 6th–9th centuries CE. It is one of the 108 Divya Desams dedicated to Vishnu, who is worshipped as Thiruvazhmarban and his consort Lakshmi as Kamalavalli. The oldest inscription in the temple is from 1139 CE indicating gifts to the temple. A granite wall surrounds the temple, enclosing all its shrines. The temple tank is located opposite to the temple, outside the main entrance.

Thiruvazhmarban is believed to have appeared to the Saptarishis, the seven sages, and to Udayanangai, the mother of Nammalvar. The place is the birthplace of Nammalvar, one of the twelve Alvar saints in Vaishnava philosophy. The temple follows Thenkalai tradition of worship. Six daily rituals and many yearly festivals are held at the temple, of which the ten-day Chittirai Brahmotsavam during the Tamil month of Chittirai (April - May), Aadi Swati festival for Kulasekara Alvar, Navaratri during September - October and Vaikunta Ekadasi during Margali (December - January) being the most prominent. The temple is maintained and administered by Kanyakumari Devasthanam.

Legend

As per Hindu legend, Saptarishis, the seven sages of Hindu Mythology are believed to have worshipped Vishnu at this place. Vishnu was pleased by their devotion and appeared at this place.

As per another legend, king Kulasekara, who would go on to become Kulashekhara Alwar came to this place after a conquest. His horse was lost and he was in search of the horse. He found that the horse was grazing peacefully on the banks of Soma Tirtham, the temple tank. After bathing in the tank, he felt rejuvanted worshipping the Vishnu temple in the banks. He is believed to have constructed the temple and named the place Thiruvanparisaram (pari in Tamil indicates horse). Thiru indicates respect, vazh means live and marban indicates the heart of the person. Since Vishnu held his consort in his heart in this place, he is commonly referred Thiruvazhmarban.

History
The exact history of the temple could not be ascertained from the inscriptions. The oldest inscription is dated from 1139 CE, when a person by name Natesan Chetti from Rajendra Cholapattinam offering donations to the temple. Two other inscriptions from the temple are dated 1613 and 1785 indicating record of offerings to the temple. A local historic account states that famous Nayak king Thirumalai Nayak (1623-59 CE) visited the place and constructed the stepped temple tank. The inscriptions in the temple refer the place is Thiruvanparisaram.

Architecture

The temple in enclosed in a rectangular enclosure surrounded by granite walls. The central shrine houses the image of the presiding deity, Thiruvazhmarban in sitting posture. There is no separate shrine for his consort Lakshmi as she is believed to reside in his chest. Surrounding the presiding deity, the images of Saptharishis are present. The images of Rama, Lakshmana and Sita are located to the right of the presiding deity. The image of Thiruvazhmarban is made of a compound of lime and granite. The sanctum also houses the images of Vishvaksenara, Kulasekara Alvar, Nataraja and Sivakami. The festival deity is made of panchaloha and all the ablution related worship practises are done only for festival deity. The shrines of Garuda, Anjaneya, Ramanuja, Vedanta Desika and Alvars are found in the second precinct. The temple tank, Soma Tirtham is located outside the main shrine. A hall named Kalyana Vimana Mandapa located near the tank houses paintings depicting Dashavatara, the ten avatars of Vishnu.

Religious significance

Thiruvazhmarban temple is revered in Nalayira Divya Prabhandam, the 7th–9th century Vaishnava canon, by Nammalvar. The temple is classified as a Divya Desam, one of the 108 Vishnu temples that are mentioned in the book. During the 18th and 19th centuries, the temple finds mention in several works like 108 Tirupathi Anthathi by Divya Kavi Pillai Perumal Aiyangar.

As per Hindu legend, Nammalvar, the most prominent Alvar saint from the 9th century was born in Thirupathisaram. There are other accounts, which place his birthplace as Thirukurukur (modern day Alwarthirunagiri) in the southernmost region of the Tamil country. Some sources consider his to have been a princely family, although of Shudra birth. It is believed that he was born fully enlightened as the baby he never cried or suckled and never opened his eyes. The child did not respond to no external stimuli and his parents carried him in a golden cradle from Tirupathisaaram and left him at the feet of the deity of Sri Adhinathar in Alwarthirunagari. The child got up and climbed into a hole in a tamarind tree, sat in a lotus position, and began to meditate.  He was in this state for sixteen years when a Tamil poet and scholar, on his trip to North India, named Madhurakavi Alvar saw a bright light shining to the south, and followed it until he reached the tree where the boy was residing. Madhurakavi asked a divine question on existence to the boy for which he responded that if the soul identifies with the body, it will be the body but if it serves the divine, it will stay in Vaikuntha and think of God. The boy was named Nammalvar and he went on to recite verses, which were recorded by Madhurakavi and later went on to be compiled as Nalayira Divya Prabhandam along with the works of other Alvars.

Religious practices and festivals
The temple follows the traditions of the Tenkalai sect of the Vaishnava tradition and follows the Vaikhanasa tradition. In modern times, the temple priests perform the puja (rituals) during festivals and on a daily basis. Six daily rituals are held at various times of the day and many yearly festivals are held at the temple, of which the ten-day Chittirai Brahmotsavam during the Tamil month of Chittirai (April - May), Adi Svati festival for Kulasekara Alvar when he is believed to attain Vaikuntha, Navaratri during September - October and Vaikuntha Ekadashi during Margali (December - January) being the most prominent. There are weekly, monthly and fortnightly rituals performed in the temple. During the Chittirai Brahmotsavam, the festival deities of the temple are taken around the streets of the temple in a chariot drawn by hundreds of devotees.

References

External links

 
Hindu temples in Kanyakumari district
Vishnu temples